The Federal Correctional Institution, Terre Haute (FCI Terre Haute) is a medium-security United States federal prison for male inmates in Indiana. It is part of the Federal Correctional Complex, Terre Haute (FCC Terre Haute) and is operated by the Federal Bureau of Prisons, a division of the United States Department of Justice. The facility also has an adjacent satellite prison camp for minimum-security male offenders.

Communication Management Unit
FCI Terre Haute has a controversial high-security wing known as the Communication Management Unit (CMU) for inmates who were determined to pose a serious threat if their communications were not severely restricted. The CMU at FCI Terre Haute is a 55-cell unit located in the former death row and was opened in December 2006. Prisoners there are under open and covert audio and video surveillance, and all of their phone calls are monitored except for talks with their attorneys. Prisoners are prohibited from touching family members during tightly controlled visits. All telephone calls and mail are monitored, and inmates are required to conduct all conversations in English unless special permission is arranged for conversations in other languages. Without such strong security, the government claims, inmates would be able to conspire with outsiders to commit terrorist or criminal acts. The Federal Bureau of Prisons created the CMU in response to criticism that it had not been adequately monitoring the communications of prisoners. According to the Bureau of Prisons, "By concentrating resources in this fashion, it will greatly enhance the agency's capabilities for language translation, content analysis and intelligence sharing," according to the Bureau's summary of the CMU.

When the CMU at FCI Terre Haute opened, 15 of the first 17 inmates were Muslim. In August 2008, 38 prisoners signed up for Ramadan observances. The disproportionate number of Muslims at the CMU led the American Civil Liberties Union (ACLU) to raise a concern about racial profiling. The ACLU also charged that the communication restrictions were unduly harsh for prisoners who are not sufficiently serious security threats to warrant placement in USP Florence ADX, the federal supermax facility in Colorado. In response, according to civil rights lawyers, the Bureau of Prisons started moving in non-Muslims. The group included tax resisters, a member of the Japanese Red Army and inmates from Colombia and Mexico. Inmates say the guards there called them "balancers." As of 2011, the Bureau of Prisons says a total of 71 men now live in the units.

Most of the inmates are Arab Muslims convicted of terrorism-related offenses. The CMU population has included men convicted in high-profile post-September 11 cases, as well as defendants from the 1993 World Trade Center bombing, the 1999 "millennium" plot to bomb the Los Angeles airport, and airline hijacking cases from 1976, 1985 and 1996. Also in the CMUs are men who have threatened officials from behind bars, ordered murders using contraband cellphones, or engaged in other communications that officials deem threatening. The population also includes several black Muslims who have been disciplined for alleged radicalization and recruitment while incarcerated for other crimes at other facilities.

Minimum-security prison camp
The minimum-security prison camp at FCI Terre Haute was built in 1960 for the purpose of housing non-violent felons to perform farm and maintenance duties. The camp has two, eight, and twelve-person rooms. Programs provided for inmates in this facility include GED, ESL, and drug education classes. Sports, cards, golf, and crafts are all different recreational activities in which the inmates may take part within the camp. A selected group of inmates at the camp take part in a community talk tour called, "Choices," where these inmates visit schools and speak to children that are already involved in meth. The Federal Bureau of Prisons National Bus Center is operated through this camp.

Notable inmates (current and former)

Domestic terrorists
American citizens who committed or attempted to commit terrorist attacks against United States citizens and interests.

Foreign terrorists
Foreign citizens who committed or attempted to commit terrorist attacks against United States citizens and interests.

Others

In popular culture
FCI Terre Haute was referenced in the film The Blues Brothers by Matt "Guitar" Murphy, who said that the prison served cabbage rolls for dinner.

The song "1st Day Out the Feds" by rapper Gucci Mane is a reference to Terre Haute Federal Correctional Institution, where he served out most of a 3-year 3-month sentence for firearm possession. His radically altered appearance, mannerisms, and demeanor upon exiting the prison in May 2016 led many to speculate that he was subjected to an experimental government program at Terre Haute and possibly even cloned by the Central Intelligence Agency. A spokesperson for the CIA dismissed these theories as mere internet rumors and refused to comment on them.

British drug smuggler Howard Marks was incarcerated in Terre Haute .

See also
List of U.S. federal prisons
Federal Bureau of Prisons
Incarceration in the United States

References

Prisons in Indiana
Buildings and structures in Terre Haute, Indiana
Terre Haute